Topsy – Standard Book is an album by trumpeter Freddie Hubbard recorded in December 1989 and released on the Japanese Alfa Jazz label. It features performances by Hubbard, Benny Green, Carl Allen, Rufus Reid and Kenny Garrett.

Reception
The Allmusic review by Scott Yanow states "the music is often more mellow than one might hope, even when uptempo. It's a pleasing but not essential release."

Track listing
 "Topsy" (Edgar Battle, Eddie Durham) - 5:17  
 "Caravan" (Duke Ellington, Irving Mills, Juan Tizol) - 10:47  
 "As Time Goes By" (Herman Hupfeld) - 6:06  
 "Cherokee" (Ray Noble) - 5:42  
 "Black Orpheus" (Luiz Bonfá, Antônio Carlos Jobim) - 6:25  
 "Love Me or Leave Me" (Walter Donaldson, Gus Kahn) - 7:51  
 "All of You" (Cole Porter) - 6:08  
 "Golden Earrings" (Victor Young) - 6:45  
 "Lament for Booker" (Hubbard, J. J. Johnson) - 7:53

Personnel 
Freddie Hubbard - trumpet
Kenny Garrett - alto saxophone, flute
Benny Green - piano
Rufus Reid - bass 
Carl Allen - drums

References 

1990 albums
Freddie Hubbard albums